Gary L. Davidson (born August 13, 1934) is an American lawyer and businessman who is based in Orange County, California.

Davidson co-founded and served as the first president of the World Hockey Association and co-founded, with former Buena Park Mayor Dennis Murphy, the American Basketball Association. He also founded the World Football League where he was the league's first president and commissioner. He was a star basketball player at Garden Grove, Calif., High School and attended the University of Redlands, Calif.

Honours
In 1973 and 1974, the Gary L. Davidson Award was presented to the most valuable player of the World Hockey Association.

In 2010, Davidson was part of the initial group of individuals elected to the World Hockey Association Hall of Fame.

References

Further reading

1934 births
Living people
American sports businesspeople
California lawyers
People from Orange County, California
World Football League executives
World Hockey Association